The Rund um Berlin was a classic cycling race based around the German city of Berlin. It was the oldest cycling race in Germany until it ended in 2008. Although it was one of the oldest races in the world, its importance was restricted to Germany. It was usually only contested by Germans, and only four times was the winner not German.

Winners 

Cycle races in Germany
Classic cycle races
Recurring sporting events established in 1896
1896 establishments in Germany
Sports competitions in Berlin
Defunct cycling races in Germany
Recurring sporting events disestablished in 2008
2008 disestablishments in Germany